is the name of two train stations in Japan:

 Tōkaichiba Station (Kanagawa)
 Tōkaichiba Station (Yamanashi)